John Edward  Wetzel is the former Pennsylvania Secretary of Corrections, having been nominated by Pennsylvania Governor Tom Corbett and confirmed in May 2011. He was subsequently re-nominated by Governor Tom Wolf in 2015.  Wetzel resigned his office effective October 1, 2021. Previously, he served on the Pennsylvania Board of Pardons.

Wetzel is also chair of the Board of Directors for The Council of State Governments Justice Center, a national nonprofit that provides practical, nonpartisan, research-driven strategies and tools to increase public safety and strengthen communities.

References

Living people
State cabinet secretaries of Pennsylvania
Bloomsburg University of Pennsylvania alumni
Pennsylvania Republicans
Year of birth missing (living people)